Charles Walker Clark, also known as "C. W. Clark" or "Charlie Clark" (November 3, 1871 – April 3, 1933), was an American businessman and the eldest son of William Andrews Clark Sr., one of the Copper Kings.

Early life
Clark was born on November 3, 1871 in Deer Lodge, Montana. His father, William A. Clark (1839–1925), was a Montana copper magnate and later a United States Senator for Montana. His mother, Katherine Louise Stauffer (1844–1893), was a socialite.

Career
He served as the manager and later as chairman of the United Verde Copper Company in Jerome, Arizona. Together with his father and his brother, he was also a partner in a bank in Butte, Montana.

Personal life
In 1896, Charles Clark married Katherine Quinn Roberts, who died in New York City in January 1904. Later that year, he married Cecelia "Celia" Tobin (1874–1965), a member of San Francisco high society, who came from one of San Francisco’s founding families, who opened and grew its Hibernia Bank and were patrons of numerous civic causes. She had been trained as a pianist and in equestrianism. They divorced and she later moved into a home in Hillsborough, California, which became known as the Tobin Clark Estate.

A fan and participant in equestrian sports, Clark resided at his "El Palomar" estate in San Mateo, California, a property he purchased in 1902 which had a polo field and race track. The owner of Thoroughbred racehorses, among his successful runners was United Verde, a horse named for his mining company. United Verde won several stakes races including the 1920 Bashford Manor Stakes and the 1922 Ben Ali Handicap.

According to Pulitzer winner Bill Dedman, Clark had "the longest private railcar ever built, which he sold to Howard Hughes." He was prone to heavy drinking and gambling.

He collected rare books. In 1917, the Book Club of California presented an exhibition of 66 incunabula from his collection at the Hill Tolerton Gallery, San Francisco.

Death
Charles Clark died of pneumonia on April 3, 1933, in New York City. He was buried in the Woodlawn Cemetery in the Bronx, New York City.

References

1871 births
1933 deaths
People from Deer Lodge, Montana
People from San Mateo, California
Businesspeople from New York City
American businesspeople in metals
American chief executives
American racehorse owners and breeders
Deaths from pneumonia in New York City
Burials at Woodlawn Cemetery (Bronx, New York)
People from Jerome, Arizona
William A. Clark family
People from Hillsborough, California